Toyota Motor Corporation's S family is a family of cable operated manual transmissions built for small to mid sized front wheel drive vehicles, but also used in mid-engine applications. The S family has received various upgrades and enhancements over its design 
life.

S50

A 5-Speed Manual Transmission.

Ratios:
 First Gear: 3.538:1
 Second Gear: 2.041:1
 Third Gear: 1.322:1
 Fourth Gear: 0.945:1
 Fifth Gear: 0.731:1
 Reverse Gear: 3.153:1
 Final Drive: 3.736:1

Applications:
 Toyota Corolla - diesel engine
 Toyota Carina - diesel engine
 Toyota Camry - diesel engine

S51

A 5-Speed Manual Transmission.

Ratios:
 First Gear: 3.538:1
 Second Gear: 1.960:1
 Third Gear: 1.250:1
 Fourth Gear: 0.945:1
 Fifth Gear: 0.731:1
 Reverse Gear: 3.153:1
 Final Drive: 3.944:1

Applications:
 Toyota Camry XV10 4 cyl
 Toyota Solara
 Toyota Carina CT211 - Diesel

S52

A 5-Speed Manual Transmission.

Ratios:
 First Gear: 3.285:1
 Second Gear: 2.041:1
 Third Gear: 1.322:1
 Fourth Gear: 0.945:1
 Fifth Gear: 0.731:1
 Reverse Gear: 3.153:1
 Final Drive: 3.944:1

Applications:
 Toyota Corolla
 Toyota Carina - gasoline engine.

S53

A 5-Speed Manual Transmission.

Ratios:
 First Gear: 3.285
 Second Gear: 2.041
 Third Gear: 1.322
 Fourth Gear: 1.028
 Fifth Gear: 0.820
 Reverse Gear: 3.153
 Final Drive: 3.944:1 
 Final Drive: 3.736:1 (1990 GT Narrow body Celica only)
Applications:
 1990-1993 Toyota Celica  
1993 Received updated synchros
 1986 ST162 Celica (Australia) (3S-GE Engine, starter under manifold)
 1990 SV21 Camry (Australia) (3S-FE Engine, starter over gearbox)
 1998 SXV20L Camry (Europa (5S-FE Engine ,starter over gearbox)

S54

A 5-Speed Manual Transmission.

Ratios
First Gear: 3.285
Second Gear: 1.960
Third Gear: 1.322
Fourth Gear: 1.028
Fifth Gear: 0.820
Reverse Gear: 3.153
Final Drive: 4.176

S54-06A = Open Differential
S54-06D = Helical Differential on 96-99 SS-III spec only

Weight (fully oiled) = 88 lbs

Applications:
 1993-1999 Celica ST202, (Starter over gearbox)
 1994-1999 Curren ST206 (3S-GE) 
 SW20 MR2 (3S-GE, 3S-FE and 5S-FE non-turbo engines)

S55

A 5-Speed Manual Transmission.

Ratios:
 First Gear: 3.538:1
 Second Gear: 1.960:1
 Third Gear: 1.250:1
 Fourth Gear: 0.945:1
 Fifth Gear: 0.731:1
 Reverse Gear: 3.153:1
 Final Drive: 3.944:1

Applications:
 Toyota Corolla
 Toyota Carina
 Toyota Camry (3sfe)

S transmission